Everybody Eats PDX (sometimes simply Everybody Eats) was a soul food restaurant in Portland, Oregon. The business closed in 2022.

Description

Everybody Eats PDX was a Black-owned, soul food restaurant that served Cajun and Creole cuisine in northwest Portland's Pearl District. Portland Monthly  Katherine Chew Hamilton described the menu as "Southern-meets-Pacific-Northwest cooking".

The brunch menu included chicken and waffles (including a peach cobbler variety) and shrimp and grits. The dinner menu included lamb chops with Cajun pasta, mashed potatoes, and asparagus as sides. The "ultimate" seafood macaroni and cheese had crab, lobster, and shrimp mixed with Tillamook cheese sauce, topped with lobster tail, king crab meat, prawns, and a Mexican cheese blend.

The interior featured a graffiti mural painted by Ray Baxter, also known as Hand of Dogg.

History

Owners Johnny Huff Jr. and Marcell Goss started Everybody Eats as a catering service in 2016. In May 2020, during the COVID-19 pandemic, the business moved into a brick and mortar in southeast Portland, operating via catering, counter service and takeout. The menu included cheesesteaks, macaroni and cheese, and po'boys.

The restaurant relocated to the Pearl District in May 2021, offering brunch, lunch, dinner, and a full bar. In September 2021, three people were injured after a gunfight broke out amongst a group of diners. The restaurant was vandalized in May 2022.

The restaurant's owners supported community organizations including Black Lives Matter and Don't Shoot PDX. Everybody Eats PDX closed in 2022.

Reception 
Kara Stokes and Maya MacEvoy included Everybody Eats PDX in Eater Portland 2022 overview of "Where to Eat and Drink in Portland’s Pearl District". The website's Ron Scott and Nathan Williams included the restaurant in a 2022 list of "13 Spots for Serious Soul Food in Portland and Beyond".

See also

 List of Black-owned restaurants
 List of Cajun restaurants
 List of defunct restaurants of the United States
 List of soul food restaurants

References

External links

 

2016 establishments in Oregon
2022 disestablishments in Oregon
Black-owned restaurants in the United States
Catering and food service companies of the United States
Creole restaurants in the United States
Defunct Cajun restaurants in the United States
Defunct restaurants in Portland, Oregon
Pearl District, Portland, Oregon
Restaurants disestablished during the COVID-19 pandemic
Restaurants disestablished in 2022
Restaurants established in 2016
Soul food restaurants in the United States